The Starck AS.20 was an experimental single seat biplane built in France in the early 1940s. Despite the occupation of France, construction continued into 1941.

Specifications

References

External links

1940s French aircraft
Biplanes
Single-engined tractor aircraft
Aircraft first flown in 1942